Ciliatocardium ciliatum, also known as the Iceland cockle, is a species of bivalve mollusc in the family Cardiidae. It can be found along the Atlantic coast of North America, ranging from Greenland to Massachusetts.

References

Cardiidae
Molluscs described in 1780